The 1997 PBA Commissioner's Cup Finals was the best-of-7 series basketball championship of the 1997 PBA Commissioner's Cup, and the conclusion of the conference's playoffs. The Gordon's Gin Boars and Alaska Milkmen played for the 67th championship contested by the league.

Gordon's Gin Boars finally ended a six-year title drought, winning their finals series over Alaska Milkmen, 4 games to 2.

Qualification

Series scoring summary

Games summary

Game 1

Chris King registered a triple-double of 40 points, 13 rebounds and 10 assists, as he figured in Gordon's key third quarter assault when they grabbed a 55–52 lead. Alaska had one last chance to stage a reversal late in the game but King took command, giving the Boars a 94–84 bubble with a minute to go.

Game 2

Chris King, despite suffering a pulled left hamstring, never gave up, he hits the dagger three-pointer from a Marlou Aquino pass with 37.2 seconds left to give the Boars a four-point lead. Doctors later found out that King had a strained ligament and a partial tear on his left hamstring.

Game 3

The Boars pulled through a down-the-wire final minute with import Chris King's inside basket and Pido Jarencio's key triple as the Milkmen succumbed to turnovers and missed attempts in their last possessions. Jarencio waxes hot with seven triples, five in the final half, on a 7-of-8 shooting from the three-point range. Alaska had one last crack to win the game but Dwight Lago's jumper went all air as Gordon's takes a 3–0 lead.

Game 4

Game 5

Game 6

A decisive 33–5 run in the third quarter as the Boars' avalanche of points blew the game wide open. Gordon's steamrolled to a 30-point lead at 79–49, going into the fourth quarter, while limiting Alaska to an all-time lowest score of five points in a quarter.

Awards
Finals MVP: Marlou Aquino (Gordon's Gin)
Best Player of the Conference: Johnny Abarrientos (Alaska)

Rosters

Broadcast notes

References

External links
PBA official website

1997 PBA season
1997
Alaska Aces (PBA) games
Barangay Ginebra San Miguel games
PBA Commissioner's Cup Finals
PBA Commissioner's Cup Finals